Re-Animator is an American film series consisting of three horror films directed by Stuart Gordon and Brian Yuzna. Loosely based on the 1922 serialized short story "Herbert West–Reanimator" by H. P. Lovecraft, the films follow the exploits of Herbert West, the inventor of a serum that can re-animate deceased bodies. West is portrayed by actor Jeffrey Combs in all three films.

The first film in the series, Re-Animator, was released in 1985. Directed by Gordon and produced by Yuzna, it stars Combs alongside Bruce Abbott, Barbara Crampton, and David Gale. It was followed by a sequel, Bride of Re-Animator, in 1990, directed by Yuzna and again starring Combs and Abbott. The third film, Beyond Re-Animator, was released in 2003.

Films

Unproduced sequels
Two unproduced sequels were Island of Re-Animator, an Island of Doctor Moreau-style story, and the better known House of Re-Animator, which would have featured Dr. Herbert West reanimating the President of the United States.

Remakes
In 2017, an Italian version entitled Herbert West: Re-Animator was released with Emanuele Cerman as Dr. Herbert West.

A film by the name of Antihuman was set to release in early 2017 before being rebranded as Re-Animator: Evolution, with Johnathan Schaech in the lead role as Dr. Herbert West. The title was then changed to Herbert West: Re-Animator with a release date of December 15, 2018, and Schaech no longer on the cast list. It was described as "much darker, more thought-provoking, and more so grounded in science than the original film" and to be in tune with the original Lovecraft story. However, no news has been released since late 2016.

Other media

Comic books
Between 1991 and 1992, Adventure Comics, a division of Malibu Comics, released two miniseries related to the films:
 Re-Animator, a three-issue adaptation of the first movie.
 Re-Animator: Dawn of the Re-Animator, a four-issue prequel to the films.

References

External links
 
 
 
 

 
American science fiction horror films
English-language films
Horror film series
American zombie films
Resurrection in film
Trilogies